Curt Haagers was a Swedish dansband formed in Gothenburg in 1966.

Discography

Studio albums
1973 - Det går som en dans 2
1975 - Ta mej mé
1977 - Min symfoni
1978 - Tinge linge ling
1981 - Santa Maria
1981 - Dansa kvack kvack
1982 - En spännande dag för Josefine
1983 - Guld och gröna skogar
1984 - Agadoo
1985 - Ännu doftar kärlek
1986 - Curt Haagers -87
1988 - Curt Haagers -88
1989 - Riktiga vänner
1990 - Curt Haagers 10
1992 - Curt Haagers 11
1994 - Curt Haagers 12
1997 - Curt Haagers 13

Compilation albums
1975 - Goa 10-i-topp bitar
2002 - Curt Haagers guldkorn
2007 - Våra mest önskade
2008 - Guldkorn vol. 2

Svensktoppen songs
Tingelingeling - 1978
Du hänger väl med opp - 1981
Hands Up - 1981-1982
Fågeldansen - 1982
Ännu doftar kärlek - 1985
Med dej i mina armar - 1986
Ta mej till havet - 1986
När du går över floden - 1988
Riktiga vänner - 1989
Jag kan se dig i mina ögon - 1990
Varma vindar och soligt hav - 1991
Bruna ögon - 1991
Det är kärlek - 1993
Skriv ett brev - 1997
När jag blundar - 1997
Du är det käraste - 1999

Citations

External links
 Curt Haagers '(archive) website

1966 establishments in Sweden
2006 establishments in Sweden
Dansbands
Musical groups established in 1966
Musical groups disestablished in 2006
Musical groups from Gothenburg